The 1974 Watney Open was a professional invitational snooker tournament, which took place between 7 September and 22 December 1974 at the Northern Snooker Centre in Leeds. Sixteen players participated, including several invited amateurs. It was played on a knockout basis with one match each weekend. Alex Higgins defeated Fred Davis 17–11 in the final, winning £1,000.

Main draw

References

Watney Open
Watney Open
Snooker competitions in England
Sports competitions in Leeds
1970s in Leeds